Umehara is a Japanese surname. Notable people with the surname include:

Daigo Umehara (born 1981), Japanese arcade fighting video game player 
Katsuhiko Umehara (born 1954), mayor of Sendai
, Japanese freestyle skier
Ryūzaburō Umehara (1888–1986), Japanese painter 
Takeshi Umehara (born 1925), Japanese philosopher and writer
Yūichirō Umehara (born 1991), Japanese voice actor 

Japanese-language surnames